The Jatapu people are a designated Scheduled Tribe in the Indian states of Andhra Pradesh and Odisha Jatapus are a Adivasitribe and are traditionally pastoral farmers. Through acculturation the Jatapus speak Telugu and have in many ways adopted the culture of the surrounding Telugu people.  There were over one million Jatapus in 1991.

References

Further reading

Scheduled Tribes of Andhra Pradesh
Telugu society
Scheduled Tribes of Odisha